Bimala Bishwakarma (also Bishwokarma) is a Nepali politician and a member of the House of Representatives, elected from CPN UML under the proportional representation system filling the Dalit and women quota.

References

Living people
Communist Party of Nepal (Unified Marxist–Leninist) politicians
Nepal Communist Party (NCP) politicians
Place of birth missing (living people)
Dalit politicians
Nepal MPs 2017–2022
Khas people
1977 births